Lejb (Lutek) Rotblat (born October 14, 1918 in Warsaw; died May 8, 1943 in Warsaw) was an activist of the Jewish resistance movement in the Warsaw Ghetto, a member of Jewish Combat Organisation (ŻOB), and a participant in the Warsaw Ghetto Uprising.

He came from an assimilated Jewish family. He lost his father when he was little. After graduation from high school in 1937 he became a counsellor at the HaNoar HaTzioni youth organisation. During World War II he joined the Zionist Bnei Akiva youth movement. He lived with his mother Maria (Miriam) Rotblat at 44 Muranowska Street in Warsaw; and in March 1943, Arie Wilner found refuge in their apartment. When the deportation to Treblinka extermination camp took place in the summer of 1942, Rotblat and his mother, director of an orphanage at 18 Mylna Street, hid a group of Jewish children in one of the houses in the ghetto.

On February 22, 1943, he participated in the elimination of a Gestapo agent, Alfred Nossig.

Between January and April 1943, he took part in collecting weapons for ŻOB. He was also engaged in production of weapons in the ghetto (hand grenades, petrol bombs). On the eve of the Warsaw Ghetto Uprising in April 1943, he was appointed a commander of his group of Bnei Akiva members, and they fought in the so-called central ghetto area.

On May 8, 1943 he was with his mother in the bunker at 18 Mila Street when it was discovered by the Germans. The fighters did not want to surrender; and at command of Arie Wilner, most of fighters committed suicide. Rotblat shot his mother first, at her own request, then killed himself.

Rotblat is buried in a mass grave along with other deceased ŻOB fighters in the place where they perished, as no exhumation was ever conducted.

Memorial
The name of Lutek Rotblat is engraved on the obelisk, set at the steps of the memorial known as Anielewicz Mound in 2006. It is among 51 names of fighters whose identities were established by historians.

References

Sources

1918 births
1943 deaths
Warsaw Ghetto Uprising insurgents
People who died in the Warsaw Ghetto
Jewish Combat Organization members
1943 suicides
Suicides by firearm in Poland
Suicides by Jews during the Holocaust
People from Warsaw